Winzer (Winemaker) is a German surname. Notable people with the surname include:

Friedrich Albrecht Winzer (1763–1830), German inventor
Hugo Winzer (1862–1937), German pair skater
 Charles Freegrove Winzer (1886-1940), British painter, active in Sri Lanka
Otto Winzer (1902–1975), East German diplomat

German-language surnames